Greenleaf Clark (August 23, 1835 – December 7, 1904) was an American jurist.

Born in Plaistow, New Hampshire, Clark received his bachelor's degree from Dartmouth College in 1866 and his law degree from Harvard Law School in 1857. He then moved to Saint Paul, Minnesota to practice law and was an attorney for the Great Northern Railroad. Clark served briefly on the Minnesota Supreme Court in 1881 and 1882. Clark died suddenly at his winter home in Lamanda Park, Pasadena, California.

Notes

1835 births
1904 deaths
People from Plaistow, New Hampshire
People from Pasadena, California
Politicians from Saint Paul, Minnesota
Dartmouth College alumni
Harvard Law School alumni
Minnesota lawyers
Justices of the Minnesota Supreme Court
Great Northern Railway (U.S.)
19th-century American judges